Carlos Montalvo is a Cuban sprint canoer who has competed since the late first decade of the 21st century. He won a bronze medal in the K-2 1000 m event at the 2009 ICF Canoe Sprint World Championships in Dartmouth.

References
Canoe09.ca profile

Cuban male canoeists
Canoeists at the 2007 Pan American Games
Living people
Year of birth missing (living people)
ICF Canoe Sprint World Championships medalists in kayak
Pan American Games medalists in canoeing
Pan American Games bronze medalists for Cuba
Central American and Caribbean Games gold medalists for Cuba
Competitors at the 2006 Central American and Caribbean Games
Central American and Caribbean Games medalists in canoeing
Medalists at the 2007 Pan American Games
20th-century Cuban people
21st-century Cuban people